Katrin Eder (born 24 October 1976) is a German politician of Alliance 90/The Greens who has been serving as State Minister for Climate Protection, Environment, Energy and Mobility in the government of Minister-President of Rhineland-Palatinate Malu Dreyer since 2021.

Early life and education
Eder was born 1976 in the West German city of Mainz and studied political science at the University of Mainz.

Political career
In November 2021, Eder was appointed State Minister for Climate Protection, Environment, Energy and Mobility. In this capacity, she is also one of the state's representatives on the Bundesrat, where she serves on the Committee on Economic Affairs; the Committee on Agriculture and Consumer Protection; the Committee on Transport; and the Commit­tee on the Envi­ronment, Na­ture Conserva­tion and Nucle­ar Safe­ty.

In October 2022, Eder publicly announced her decision not to become her party's candidate to succeed Michael Ebling as Mayor of Mainz.

Other activities
 Federal Network Agency for Electricity, Gas, Telecommunications, Posts and Railway (BNetzA), Member of the Rail Infrastructure Advisory Council (since 2021)

References

1976 births
Living people
People from Mainz
Alliance 90/The Greens politicians
21st-century German politicians
21st-century German women politicians
Women ministers of State Governments in Germany
Women government ministers of Germany